"Luton Airport" is a song performed in 1979 by the British all-female band Cats U.K. It reached No. 22 in the UK Singles Chart, and was inspired by the punchline of a 1977 television commercial for Campari featuring Lorraine Chase.

Production
In the 1977 Campari television commercial, model and actress Lorraine Chase is shown being wooed by Jeremy Clyde over drinks. In response to his romantic line "Were you truly wafted here from paradise?" she replies in a strong Cockney accent, "Nahh, Luton Airport!". The humorous punchline became very popular, and in 1979, songwriter Paul Curtis and record producer John Worsley came up with the idea for a song while on holiday in Majorca. Curtis was already well known for writing several UK Eurovision Song Contest entries.

The writers approached Jill Shirley about finding suitable singers for the group. Shirley had been involved with the UK heats for Eurovision for a number of years and would go on to form Bucks Fizz, Gem and Bardo. The song was also offered to Lorraine Chase, but she refused it. Finally it was offered to the UK girl band Cats U.K. The lead singer was Bea Rowley who, as a leading TV dancer, who had worked with many of the major choreographers of the 1980s including Geoff Richer, Nigel Lythgoe and Arlene Phillips. The band also included Deena Payne (who coincidentally went on to appear with Chase in the long-running soap opera Emmerdale). Payne, along with two others, supplied the backing vocals. The song was produced by Curtis and Worsley at WEA records.

Release
The song made number 22 on the UK Singles Chart. In a 2010 interview, Deena Payne incorrectly claimed that the song reached number 9:

Some releases of the record featured a censored version, which bleeped out the line "Sod it" from the lyrics. Although released with the same catalogue number (K 18075), this version is easily identifiable due to the word "Bleeped" added above the title on the record label.

Cats UK released two further singles, "Sixteen Looking for Love" and "Holiday Camp" (both 1980), which failed to reach the charts. The group was disbanded.

Both the song and the name of the group likely drew inspiration from the early 1979 Squeeze hit "Cool for Cats," which featured a cockney vocal and similar chord changes and lyrical cadences.

References

External links
Luton Airport on Discogs

1979 singles
1979 songs
Luton Airport
British pop songs